John Warde may refer to:

John William Warde, committed suicide
John Warde (mayor fl.1375) on List of Lord Mayors of London
John Warde (mayor fl.1485) on List of Lord Mayors of London

See also
John Ward (disambiguation)